Frank Haslam (1872 – 1955) was an English footballer who played as a defender for Mansfield Town, Burslem Port Vale, and Notts County in the 1890s.

Career
Haslam played for Mansfield Town before joining Burslem Port Vale in May 1894. He made his debut at left-half in a 1–0 win over Walsall Town Swifts at the Athletic Ground on 1 September. He was only to play seven more Second Division games that season however, and was transferred to Notts County in March 1895.

Career statistics
Source:

References

Footballers from Mansfield
English footballers
Association football defenders
Mansfield Town F.C. players
Port Vale F.C. players
Notts County F.C. players
English Football League players
1872 births
1955 deaths